2,6-Di-tert-butylpyridine is an organic compound with the formula (Me3C)2C5H3N.  This colourless, oily liquid is derived from pyridine by replacement of the two H atoms with tert-butyl groups.   It is a hindered base.  For example, it can be protonated, but it does not form an adduct with boron trifluoride.

Preparation
2,6-Di-tert-butylpyridine is prepared by the reaction of tert-butyllithium with pyridine.  The synthesis is reminiscent of the Chichibabin reaction.

Some related bulky pyridine compounds have been described, including 2,4,6-tri-t-butylpyridine. and 2,6-di-tert-butyl-4-methylpyridine.

See also
2,4,6-Tri-tert-butylpyrimidine, a bulky base that is less expensive than the tert-buytylpyridines

References

Pyridines
Reagents for organic chemistry
Non-nucleophilic bases
Tert-butyl compounds